Lake Murray Airport  is an airport at Lake Murray, Papua New Guinea.

Airlines and destinations

Airports in Papua New Guinea
Western Province (Papua New Guinea)